The 1973 All-Ireland Minor Hurling Championship was the 43rd staging of the All-Ireland Minor Hurling Championship. The championship began on 5 August 1973 and ended on 2 September 1973.

Kilkenny were the defending champions.

On 2 September 1973, Kilkenny won the championship following a 4-5 to 3-7 defeat of Galway in the All-Ireland final. This was their 9th All-Ireland title and their second championship title in succession.

Teams

Results

All-Ireland Minor Hurling Championship

Semi-final

Final

Scoring statistics

Overall

Top scorers in a single game

External links
 All-Ireland Minor Hurling Championship: Roll Of Honour

Minor
All-Ireland Minor Hurling Championship